Konstantin Valeryevich Kovalenko (born 2 February 1975) is a Belarusian and Russian former professional footballer. He also worked as a youth coach with FC Krasnodar in Russia.

Career
He made his professional debut in the Soviet Second League in 1991 for FC Kuban Barannikovsky. He played 1 game in the 1996–97 UEFA Cup for FC Spartak Moscow.

His brother Andrei Kovalenko also played football professionally.

On 27 October 2008 he punched referee Sergei Timofeyev in the face in the Russian Second Division game FC Sochi-04 - FC Olimpia Volgograd. He was banned from football for a year.

Honours
Spartak Moscow
 Russian Premier League champion: 1996.

References

External links
 

1975 births
People from Rahachow
Living people
Soviet footballers
Belarusian footballers
Association football midfielders
Belarus international footballers
Belarusian expatriate footballers
Expatriate footballers in Russia
Expatriate footballers in Ukraine
Belarusian expatriate sportspeople in Ukraine
FC Armavir players
FC Kremin Kremenchuk players
FC Spartak Moscow players
FC Kuban Krasnodar players
FC Zhemchuzhina Sochi players
FC Spartak Vladikavkaz players
FC Chernomorets Novorossiysk players
FC Saturn Ramenskoye players
PFC Spartak Nalchik players
FC Luch Vladivostok players
FC Metallurg Lipetsk players
Russian Premier League players
Ukrainian Premier League players
FC Slavyansk Slavyansk-na-Kubani players
Sportspeople from Gomel Region